Békés is a district in central-northern part of Békés County. Békés is also the name of the town where the district seat is found. The district is located in the Southern Great Plain Statistical Region.

Geography 
Békés District borders with Szeghalom District to the north, Sarkad District to the east, Békéscsaba District to the south, Szarvas District and Gyomaendrőd District to the west. The number of the inhabited places in Békés District is 7.

Municipalities 
The district has 2 towns and 5 villages.
(ordered by population, as of 1 January 2012)

The bolded municipalities are cities.

Demographics

In 2011, it had a population of 37,409 and the population density was 71/km².

Ethnicity
Besides the Hungarian majority, the main minorities are the Roma (approx. 2,000), German and Slovak (450), Romanian (100).

Total population (2011 census): 37,409
Ethnic groups (2011 census): Identified themselves: 36,283 persons:
Hungarians: 32,978 (90.89%)
Gypsies: 2,102 (5.78%)
Germans: 461 (1.27%)
Slovaks: 448 (1.23%)
Others and indefinable: 294 (0.81%)
Approx. 1,000 persons in Békés District did not declare their ethnic group at the 2011 census.

Religion
Religious adherence in the county according to 2011 census:

Reformed – 9,393;
Catholic – 3,367 (Roman Catholic – 3,321; Greek Catholic – 46);
Evangelical – 1,638;
other religions – 1,270; 
Non-religious – 13,812; 
Atheism – 326;
Undeclared – 7,603.

Gallery

See also
List of cities and towns of Hungary

References

External links
 Postal codes of the Békés District

Districts in Békés County